Lasioedma is a genus of moths in the family Geometridae of the order Lepidoptera.

References

Geometridae